Bandrowski is a Polish surname. It may refer to:
 Bronisław Bandrowski (1879–1914), Polish philosopher
 Ernest Tytus Bandrowski (1853–1920), Polish chemist
 Tomasz Bandrowski (born 1984), Polish footballer

See also
 Juliusz Kaden-Bandrowski (1885–1944), Polish journalist